Markíza Dajto ("Dajto" means "Giveit" in Slovak) is the first niche channel aimed at young, active men in Slovakia. The channel, which launched on 20 August 2012, is owned by Central European Media Enterprises and currently has a reach of approximately 90% of the country's 5.4 million people and broadcasts 24 hours per day.

Dajto showcases top foreign series, shows and movies targeted at young male viewers. This includes CME's own regionally produced programs, highly rated European & American series, infotainment shows, as well as a la mode American or European movies.

The channel is extending its programming including highly rated foreign titles as well as gradually delivered locally produced content relevant to its audience.

Television series

Airing currently
Cobra 11 (all seasons)
Common Law
Breaking Bad (season 1-4)
Fringe (seasons 1-3)
M*A*S*H
NCIS: Los Angeles (seasons 1-3)
Nikita (season 1-2)
Seafarers (all seasons)
Smallville (season 9)
Star Trek: The Next Generation (all seasons)
Walker, Texas Ranger (all seasons)
Servant of the people

Ended
Bionic Woman
Charlie's Angels
Chuck (season 2)
Dark Blue (all seasons)
Flashpoint (season 1-3)
Franklin & Bash (all seasons)
Hex (all seasons)
Human Target (all seasons)
Chase
Inspector Rex (all seasons)
Jake and the Fatman (all season)
Las Vegas (season 3-5)
Lasko - The Fist of God (season 1)
Last Resort
Married... with Children (season 1-8)
Person of Interest (season 1)
R.I.S. Police Scientifique (seasons 1-5)
Rockface (all seasons)
Southland (season 1-2)
Spartacus: Blood and Sand
Spartacus: Gods of the Arena
The Beast
The Big Bang Theory (season 1)
The Unusuals
Tower Prep
True Justice (season 1)
V (all seasons)
XIII: The Series (season 1)

Documentaries

Ended
Aftermath: Population Zero
Super Size Me

TV Shows

Airing currently
PokerStars Big Game
Top Gear (all seasons)

Ended
Fort Boyard (all seasons of Slovak version)

Animated series

Airing currently
The Tom and Jerry Comedy Show (all seasons)
The Yogi Bear Show (all seasons)
Transformers: Animated (all seasons)
Teenage Mutant Ninja Turtles (all seasons)
X-Men (all seasons)

Ended
Duck Dodgers: Attack of the Drones
Jackie Chan Adventures (all seasons)
Kung Fu Panda: Legends of Awesomeness (season 1)
Men in Black: The Series (all seasons)
SpongeBob SquarePants (season 1-5)
Scooby-Doo (all seasons)
Stuart Little: The Animated Series
The Flintstone Kids (all seasons)
The Penguins of Madagascar (all seasons)

Sport events

Airing currently
2014-2015 Fortuna Liga (last 5 rounds)
2013 Formula One Season (selected races)
2014 FIFA World Cup qualification (UEFA) (selected matches)
Red Bull X-Fighters (selected races)
WBA (selected fights)

Upcoming 

 UEFA Euro 2024 (all matches)
 UEFA Euro 2028 (all matches)

Ended
2012 European Hockey Trophy
2012–13 FA Cup (selected matches)
2012–13 UEFA Champions League (selected matches)
2013 Wimbledon Championships*
Bratislava Tennis Classics 2012

External links

TV Dajto at LyngSat Address
Program TV Dajto

Mass media in Slovakia
Television channels in Slovakia
Television channels and stations established in 2012